The Freedom Conservative Party of Alberta was an Albertan autonomist, libertarian and conservative political party in Alberta, Canada.

The party was named the Alberta First Party from 1999 to 2004, when it changed its name to the Separation Party of Alberta. In 2013, it reverted to Alberta First. In April 2018, it became the Western Freedom Party of Alberta. On June 22, 2018, it was announced that the Western Freedom Party had changed to its present name.

On April 27, 2020, the party announced plans to merge with Wexit Alberta and for a new party called the Wildrose Independence Party of Alberta. Members of both parties voted to approve the merger on June 29, 2020.  In July 2020, Wildrose Independence Party of Alberta was officially registered with Elections Alberta, giving effect to the merger.

MLAs 
The party had one member (Derek Fildebrandt) in the Alberta Legislature prior to the 2019, Alberta general election.

Beliefs 
According to the founding documents  the main objectives of the party were as follows:
 Autonomy for Alberta
 Freedom for Alberta
 Responsibility for Alberta's government.

The Freedom Conservative Party advocates for an autonomous Alberta within a United Canada and is libertarian, and fiscally conservative in its leanings.  For example, the parties founding documents call for the government to "pass no law to protect two consenting adults from themselves" and "abolish unnecessary controls over the economy".

Fiscally the founding document lays out that Alberta should "collect no more revenue than is needed and spend no more revenue than is required".

History 
The Freedom Conservative Party took over the legal shell of the former Alberta First Party. After changing its name to the Freedom Conservative Party of Alberta on June 22, 2018, it gained its first MLA after Derek Fildebrandt changed his affiliation from Independent Conservative and crossed the floor after being barred from running as a candidate for the United Conservative Party.

He was appointed interim leader, pending a vote. During the announcement of the new party, Fildebrandt stated that it is not a separatist party but rather, its members were "conservatives, libertarians and Alberta patriots".

It plans to run candidates in conservative strongholds, such as rural Alberta. Fildebrandt has stated he intends to avoid placing candidates in ridings where he believes the incumbent governing New Democratic Party would have a chance of winning in case of a split in the conservative vote.

Leadership election  
The party's first convention under the Freedom Party name was held in Chestermere and first leadership race since 1999 was held on October 20, 2018. Interim leader Derek Fildebrandt was the only leadership candidate, and therefore was acclaimed as leader. After the 2019 Alberta General Election and resignation of Derek Fildebrandt, David White was elected on the second ballot as Interim Leader of the Freedom Conservative Party at a party meeting in Calgary on May 4, 2019. Three candidates were on the ballot.

Election results 
The 30th Alberta general election which will be held in 2019 is the Freedom Conservative Parties first contested election in its current form.

In the Alberta 2019 election, the party is so far confirmed to be running the following candidates in the following ridings:

 Derek Fildebrandt (Leader) in Chestermere-Strathmore
 Matthew Morrisey in Airdrie-Cochrane
 Rick Northey in Airdrie-East
 Regina Shakirova in Calgary-Bow
 Kari Pomerleau in Calgary-Foothills
 Dejan Ristic in Calgary-Glenmore
 Sheyne Espey in Calgary-Peigan
 Cam Khan in Calgary-North West
 Rio Aiello in Calgary-West
 Wesley Caldwell in Camrose
 Steve Goodman in Drayton Valley-Devon
 Jason Norris in Edmonton-Whitemud
 Malcolm Stinson in Fort Saskatchewan-Vegreville
 Bernard Hancock in Grande Prairie (provincial electoral district)
 Chad Miller in Innisfail-Sylvan Lake
 Jeff Rout in Leduc-Beaumont
 Keith Parrill in Lacombe-Ponoka
 David White in Maskwacis-Wetaskiwin
 Allen Maclennan in Olds-Didsbury-Three Hills
 Connie Russell in Peace River (provincial electoral district)
 Matt Chapin in Red Deer North
 Teah-Jay Cartwright in Red Deer South
 Dawn Berard in Rimbey-Rocky Mountain House-Sundre
 Jim McKinnon in Vermilion-Lloydminster-Wainwright

Leadership history

See also 

 Alberta separatism
 Western alienation

References

External links 
 Freedom Conservative Party of Alberta website

 
Provincial political parties in Alberta
Autonomy
Conservative parties in Canada
Libertarian conservative parties
Political parties established in 1999
1999 establishments in Alberta
Right-libertarianism